Shimla district  is a one of the twelve districts of the state of Himachal Pradesh in northern India. Its headquarters is the state capital of Shimla. Neighbouring districts are Mandi and Kullu in the north, Kinnaur in the east, Uttarakhand in the southeast, Solan to the southwest and Sirmaur in the south.

As of 2011, it is the third most populated district of Himachal Pradesh (out of 12), after Kangra and Mandi. It is the most urbanized district of Himachal Pradesh.

Administrative structure

Access

By road 

Shimla is connected by road to all the major towns. Distance between the major towns and Shimla:
 Kalka - 80 km
 Patiala - 172 km
 Chandigarh - 119 km
 Ambala - 166 km
 Delhi - 380 km
 Agra - 568 km
 Amritsar - 342 km
 Jammu (via Pathankot) - 482 km
 Srinagar - 787 km
 Jaipur - 629 km
 Dharmsala (via Mandi) - 290 km
 Dharamsala (via Hamirpur) - 235 km
 Dalhousie - 345 km
 Chamba - 401 km
 Kullu - 235 km
 Manali - 280 km
 Mandi - 153 km
 Palampur - 270 km
 Dehradoon - 275 km
 Rampur - 132 km
 Kumarsain - 80 km
 Narkanda - 60 km
 Rohru - 129 km
 Theog - 28 km
 Chaupal - 100 km

Climate

Demographics

According to the 2011 census, the district had a population of 814,010. This gives it a ranking of 483rd in India (out of a total of 640). Its population growth rate over the decade 2001-2011 was 12.67%. Shimla has a sex ratio of  915 females for every 1000 males, and a literacy rate of 83.64%. 24.74% of the population lives in urban areas. Scheduled Castes and Scheduled Tribes make up 26.51% and 1.08% of the population respectively.

Religion

Language

At the time of the 2011 census of India, 67.61% of the population recorded their language as Pahadi, 20.31% Hindi, 4.63% Nepali, 1.39% Punjabi and 1.05% Kangri as their first language.

Politics 

 

|}

Villages
 

Bhattakufer
Nerwa

Notes

References

External links 

 Official website of the Shimla district
 District Profile
 Cultural & tourism heritage of the district

 
Districts of Himachal Pradesh